The North American Native Museum, or Nordamerika Native Museum (NONAM), is a museum run by the City of Zurich, Switzerland. The museum specializes in the conservation, documentation, and presentation of ethnographic objects and artwork of Native American, First Nation, and Inuit cultures.

History

Gottfried Hotz and the "Indianermuseum" 

The foundations for the North American Native Museum Zurich were laid in 1961, when the city of Zurich bought the formerly private collection of Gottfried Hotz. Two years later, the Hotz collection was installed in a school building in Zurich's Aussersihl district, where it was opened to the public as Indianermuseum der Stadt Zürich. In 1977, Hans Läng succeeded Mr. Hotz and assumed office as curator of the Indianermuseum. Mr. Läng expanded the collection until his retirement in 1993. This year proved to be a turning point in the history of the museum, as the new director / curator Denise Daenzer ventured into a re-orientation of the museum's work, presenting varying exhibitions of the collection's objects and special exhibitions addressing specific topics.

The Nordamerika Native Museum 

As the museum staff was increasingly collaborating with Native Americans, Inuit, and First Nations, a change of the museum's name seemed to be indicated. In early 2003, the museum opened its gates in its current location in the Seefeld district, as the Nordamerika Native Museum (NONAM). Denise Daenzer continued to direct the museum, expanding the collections and curating most of the museum's temporary exhibitions until 2012. Ms. Daenzer retired in 2012 and was succeeded by Heidrun Löb, the current director.

Exhibitions

Permanent exhibitions

Main exhibition 

A part of the museum's collections is on permanent display in the second floor, organized according to the culture areas of the Americas frequently used in the cultural anthropology of North America.

Bodmer Gallery 

In 2013 the museum added a small gallery, showing selected original works of Karl Bodmer.

Soundscape 

In the museum's "soundscape" installation, visitors can explore the world of the Inuit, Kwakwaka'wakw (Kwakiutl), Hopi and Diné (Navajo) with their ears only. The "sounding museum" has been accredited by the UNESCO committee as a contribution to the International Year for the Rapprochement of Cultures, 2010.

Special exhibitions 

Some of the special exhibitions the NONAM showed since the museum's relocation in 2003 are the following:

Katsinam – Cloud People and Ancestral Spirits 04.22.2018 – 03.03.2019
Leo Yerxa – Tales from the Woodlands 10.05.2017 – 02.25.2018
Bison, Büffel, Buffalo – Decline, Crisis and Comeback of the American Bison 12.20.2016 – 09.03.2017
Calling the Animals – Arctic stories, drawn, printed and carved in stone 03.17.2016 – 07.03.2016
Vanishing Thule – A Culture on thin Ice 10.01.2015 – 02.28.2016
Native Art Now – Contemporary Indigenous Art 11.08.2014 – 06.07.2015
Land, Art, Horizons – Land Reflected in Contemporary Native American Art 04.10.2014 – 09.07.2014
Learning to Survive – Education in Native American, First Nation and Inuit cultures 05.08.2013 – 02.28.2014
Fascinating «Indians» – European Imagination of Native Americans through the Centuries 03.22.2012 – 10.31.2012
From Cod – Liver Oil to Totem Animal – Animals in the Native Cultures of North America 02.10.2011 – 12.31.2011
Mantu'c – The Language of Glass Beads 04.15.2010 – 11.14.2010
Karl Bodmer – A Swiss Artist in North America 02.08.2009 – 08.09.2009
Aiguuq! – Arctic treasures from Swiss Museums 03.08.2008 – 08.17.2008
Life at the Edge of the World – Photographs of Northern Greenland by Markus Bühler–Rasom 11.01.2007 – 02.24.2008
Richly Adorned – Native American Jewelry from Arizona and New Mexico 06.17.2007 – 10.15.2007
Canoe Kayak – Native American and Inuit Boats 09.17.2006 – 05.31.2007
Swiss Pioneers – in the Land of the Lakota and Crow 05.18.2006 – 09.03.2006
Traditions of Change – Contemporary Art of the Athabaskan and Tlingit 09.17.2005 – 04.30.2006
Cherokee People Today – Photographs by David G. Fitzgerald 02.03.2005 – 08.31.2005
Living Environments – Environments of Art Contemporary Iroquois Art 06.05.2004 – 12.31.2004
Katsinam – Ceremonial Figures of the Pueblo Cultures 09.21.2003 – 04.30.2004
Inuit Art – Art for Survival  01.26.2003 – 08.20.2003

Publications 

Publications of the NONAM are usually in German language.

Vanishing Thule – Eine Kultur auf dünnem Eis. NONAM, Zurich 2015. German.
Native Art Now – Zeitgenössische indigene Kunst. NONAM, Zurich 2014. German.
Faszination Indianer – Vorstellungen, Darstellungen – ein Streifzug durch die Jahrhunderte. NONAM, Zurich 2012. German. An accompanying English booklet is available upon request.
Mantu'c – little spirits: Die Sprache der Glasperlen. NONAM, Zürich 2010. German.
Karl Bodmer: A Swiss Artist in America / Karl Bodmer: Ein Schweizer Künstler in Amerika. Scheidegger & Spiess Zürich 2009. German and English.
Inuit – Leben am Rande der Welt / Inuit – Life at the Edge of the World. 141 photographs and 7 panoramic Images by Markus Bühler-Rasom, black and white and in color. Kontrast Verlag, Zurich, 2007. German and English. Including booklet ("Reisetagebuch") "Travel diary" in German or English.  (German),  (English).
Reich geschmückt – Indianischer Schmuck aus Arizona und New Mexico. NONAM, Zurich 2007. German.
Kanu Kajak – Boote der Indianer und Inuit. NONAM, Zurich 2007. German.
Aiguuq! – Arktische Schätze aus Schweizer Museen. NONAM, Zurich 2008. German.
Traditions of Change – Neue Kunst der Athapasken und Tlingit aus dem Yukon. NONAM, Zurich 2005. German.

References

External links 
 Official website (German)
 Official website (English)

Museums in Zürich
Ethnic museums
Ethnographic museums in Switzerland
Native American history
First Nations history
Inuit history
Native American museums